Zervos is a surname. Notable people with the surname include:

Christian Zervos (1889–1970), French writer
Kevin Zervos (born 1953), Hong Kong judge
Komninos Zervos (born 1950), Greek poet
Mihail Zervos, Greek financial mathematician
Pantelis Zervos (1913–1991), Greek actor
Skevos Zervos (1875–1966), Greek professor
Summer Zervos, Apprentice contestant

See also  
Zervos (dance), Greek folk-dance

Greek-language surnames
Surnames